HMS Nene was a , designed for anti-submarine operations, that served with the Royal Navy during the Second World War. In 1944 she was loaned to the Royal Canadian Navy and recommissioned as HMCS Nene, who returned her to the Royal Navy in 1945. Following the war she remained in reserve until disposed of in 1955.

Service history

Royal Navy
Nene was ordered on 24 January 1942 and built at Smiths Dock Co., Middlesbrough England. She was laid down on 20 June 1942 launched on 9 December later that year. The vessel was commissioned on 8 April 1943 into the Royal Navy. A Warship Week National Savings effort led to the community of Oundle – which lies on the River Nene – in Northamptonshire adopting the ship.

The ship joined the Western Approaches Command at Derry, Northern Ireland, and crossed the Atlantic on convoy duty to St. John's. The ship was involved in operations of the Royal Navy Support Group, then attached to the 5th and later 6th Escort Group, Western Approaches Command. In February 1944, the frigate was involved in anti-submarine operations off the west coast of Ireland, assisting in the sinking of submarine U-536 near the Azores.

Royal Canadian Navy
In March 1944 Nene arrived at Halifax, Nova Scotia, where the ship underwent a refit and was recommissioned into the Royal Canadian Navy, as HMCS Nene. In July the ship headed to Bermuda on a training run for the new crew, after which Nene joined Escort Group C5 Western Approaches Command. From the group's base at Derry, the ship escorted three transatlantic convoys with this group.

Nene served briefly as part of the convoy JW 61A, escorting personnel carriers, and then was assigned to Escort Group 9. After anti-submarine patrol around the British Isles, during which two of the group's ships were torpedoed, the frigate became one of many ships escorting convoys on the Murmansk Run. In April 1945, at Portsmouth harbour, SS Cuba, was torpedoed, and the crew of Nene rescued 265 sailors from the sinking ship.

Return to the Royal Navy
On 11 June 1945 Nene was returned to the Royal Navy at Sheerness. Her Canadian crew were sent to the naval base at Greenlock, Scotland to await the trip home.

Nene was reclassified as a B2 reserve ship, was towed to Harwich and later to Barrow-in-Furness, and finally broken up for salvage in 1955 by Thos. W. Ward at Briton Ferry, Wales.

References

Bibliography
 
 Geoffrey B Mason RN (edited Gordon Smith) HMS, later HMCS Nene (K 270) Service Histories of Royal Navy Warships in World War 2 naval-history.net (2005)
 HMS Nene (K 270) uboat.net
 HMCS Nene (K 270) uboat.net

External links

 

River-class frigates of the Royal Canadian Navy
1942 ships
Ships built on the River Tees